Statistics of Mestaruussarja in the 1966 season.

Overview
It was contested by 12 teams, and KuPS Kuopio won the championship.

League standings

Results

References
Finland - List of final tables (RSSSF)

Mestaruussarja seasons
Fin
Fin
1